Lesley Goldie is a British actress of the early to mid-1970s, especially and better known for her appearances on The Benny Hill Show as guest star.

Her works also include appearances with Mike & Bernie Winters, Frankie Howerd, Des O'Connor and Jimmy Tarbuck; such television programs as Bless This House, Bachelor Father, Father, Dear Father and Tales of the Unexpected (on the last of which she had a small role in a 1981 episode, her last known acting role to date); the 1973 film version of Love Thy Neighbour; and appearances on the London stage including Suddenly at Home (as Maggie Howard, in 1972-73) and The Gay Lord Quex (in 1975, directed by John Gielgud and also co-starring Dame Judi Dench and Siân Phillips).

Personal life
Born Lesley Goldie, she attended school at Holy Trinity Convent, Bromley and went on to study in Queen Mary University of London. After her marriage she changed her name to Lesley O'Connor for some time. She has two children, sons Ciaran O'Connor and Tristan Goldie. Goldie had a run in the late 1970s as an English teacher. As of 2014, she is working as an interior designer.

References

External links

British Film Institute filmography for Lesley Goldie

Year of birth missing (living people)
Living people
English television actresses
20th-century English actresses